Walter Augustine Brown (February 10, 1905 – September 7, 1964) was the founder and original owner of the Boston Celtics, as well as an important figure in the development of ice hockey in the United States.

Life
He was born in Hopkinton, Massachusetts, and attended Boston Latin from 1922 to 1923 and Phillips Exeter Academy from 1923 to 1926.  After succeeding his father, George V. Brown, as manager of the Boston Garden, he stated his belief that, "Boston should have a basketball team." Taking a mortgage out on his home, he founded the Celtics in 1945. He then helped to found the Basketball Association of America in 1946, and was instrumental in merging the BAA and the National Basketball League into the National Basketball Association in 1949.

Brown ran the Celtics as a subsidiary of the Boston Garden-Arena Corporation until 1950, when he bought the team in his own name and took on former Providence Steamrollers owner Lou Pieri as a minority partner. He oversaw the transformation of the Celtics into a dynasty, as they won six championships in the seven years before his death.  He is buried in St. John the Evangelist Cemetery in Hopkinton, Massachusetts.

Brown was the President of the Boston Athletic Association from 1941 to 1964. In 1951 during the height of the Korean War, Brown denied Koreans entry into the Boston Marathon. He stated: "While American soldiers are fighting and dying in Korea, every Korean should be fighting to protect his country instead of training for marathons. As long as the war continues there, we positively will not accept Korean entries for our race on April 19."

Hockey
Brown also played an important role in the development of hockey; he coached the amateur Boston Olympics to five Eastern Hockey League championships and guided the USA to its first gold medal in the Ice Hockey World Championships in 1933. In February 1940, Brown and eight other arena managers organized the Ice Capades. In 1951, he bought the financially strapped Boston Bruins; he had been the Bruins' landlord since becoming the Garden's manager.  He served as the president of the International Ice Hockey Federation from 1954 to 1957.

The Walter A. Brown International Hockey Tournament was held in Colorado Springs, Colorado from 1964-1968. That "Brown Trophy" can be seen in at least one publication from the Pikes Peak region. It is not the same as the Larry O'Brien Championship Trophy.

Honors
 
Brown was honored by having the NBA championship trophy named after him after he died in 1964.

He was inducted into the Hockey Hall of Fame in 1962, the Naismith Memorial Basketball Hall of Fame in 1965, and IIHF Hall of Fame in 1997, its inaugural year.

See also
 Walter Brown Arena

References

External links
 

1905 births
1964 deaths
Boston Athletic Association
Boston Bruins executives
Boston Bruins owners
Boston Celtics executives
Boston Celtics owners
Boston Garden
Hockey Hall of Fame inductees
International Ice Hockey Federation executives
IIHF Hall of Fame inductees
Lester Patrick Trophy recipients
Naismith Memorial Basketball Hall of Fame inductees
People from Hopkinton, Massachusetts
Phillips Exeter Academy alumni
Sportspeople from Middlesex County, Massachusetts
United States Hockey Hall of Fame inductees